Helmut Michel was a U.S. soccer goalkeeper who earned one cap with the U.S. national team.

In 1961, Michel was with Chicago Schwaben of the National Soccer League of Chicago.

He also earned one cap with the U.S. national team in a 2-0 loss to Colombia
  Michel was injured at half time and was replaced by Kenny Finn.

United States men's international soccer players
Association football goalkeepers
National Soccer League (Chicago) players
Chicago Schwaben players
Living people
American soccer players
Year of birth missing (living people)